The Australia A cricket team is a cricket team representing Australia and is the second team of the Australian cricket team.

In the Australian summer of 1994–95, the (then) Benson and Hedges World Series Cup was expanded to involve four teams instead of the usual three – Australia, England, Zimbabwe and Australia A (though games involving Australia A are not considered official One-Day Internationals). In a shock result, the Australia A team (captained by Damien Martyn and featuring up-and-comers such as Ricky Ponting, Matthew Hayden and Greg Blewett, as well as veterans – wicket-keeper Phil Emery and pacemen Paul Reiffel and Merv Hughes) ousted England from the series and went into the best-of-3 final against Australia. They were swept 2–0, but it was unquestionably a display of the next generation of Australia's prowess. Many of the 1994–95 A players later played for Australia.

In earlier times, Australia often sent Second XI teams on overseas tour, consisting of players on the fringes of national selection. Instances of this occurred in 1949–50 and 1959–60, to New Zealand.

In one-day cricket, Australia A's team colours were the same as Australia's, except reversed with dark green instead of bottle green and canary yellow instead of wattle gold.

Results summary

Former players

Current squad
Australia A squad for Australian tour of Sri Lanka 2022

References

Cricket, A
Australia in international cricket
National 'A' cricket teams